Elaine Bay is a bay located in Pelorus Sound / Te Hoiere, within the Marlborough Sounds at the north end of the South Island of New Zealand. Elaine Bay is in the Tawhitinui Reach (a branch of the main section of Pelorus Sound / Te Hoiere), which includes other bays such as Tennyson Inlet, Fitzroy Bay and Hallum Cove. 
The bay is accessed by the Elaine Bay Road, which connects with the Croisilles-French Pass Road at the top of the ridge.

Attractions
There is a Department of Conservation Campsite situated right on the water's edge. 
The beach in Elaine Bay is mostly rocky, with some small patches of gravel. Despite this, it is popular for swimming, as it has multiple wharfs and a swimming platform. All of these structures are maintained by Elaine Bay Aquaculture. There are also a couple of walking tracks: the Piwakawaka Track, which is an easy hour and a half return, and goes around to the next bay which has a golden beach that is perfect for picnicking and swimming; and the Archer Track, which is 4 hrs return, and connects Elaine Bay to Penzance Bay via a wide, well-used track which provides great views of spectacular scenery. There are also sea kayaks available for hire within the bay.

Elaine Bay is fed by a number of streams, and this creates a very rich ecosystem. Schools of fish such as herrings, kahawai and mackerel are found in great numbers. There are also a large number of birds including cormorants (known as shags) and weka.
This diversity of wildlife, typical of the Marlborough Sounds, provides a rich fishing environment. 
There is also a boat ramp, moorings and small dock, which provide easy access to boating opportunities.

Industry
Elaine Bay hosts a small fishing and aquaculture port. Many smaller fishing vessels and large mussel boats regularly dock at the port. The main product is green lipped mussels, for which Pelorus Sound / Te Hoiere and its main port Havelock are famous. Many of the surrounding bays contain mussel farms, which are a large employer for the region.
There is also a small forestry industry in Elaine Bay. Since the 1970s areas of Pelorus have a planted in exotic pine forest for timber. The Archer Track goes through some of this logging forest.

Access
The bay is accessed by the Elaine Bay Road, which is off Croisilles-French Pass Road. The road is paved all the way through to Elaine Bay, because of the trucks regularly accessing the Port.

Settlement
Apart from a few permanent residents, the settlement at Elaine Bay consists mostly of baches, small holiday homes.

References

Bays of the Marlborough Region
Marlborough Sounds